Yehuda Dranitzki (born 26 April 1910, died 14 June 2002) was an Israeli politician who served as a member of the Knesset for the Alignment and Mapam between 1974 and 1977.

Biography
Born in Odessa in the Russian Empire, Dranitzki joined Hashomer Hatzair after it had been banned by Soviet authorities. In 1925 he made aliyah to Mandatory Palestine, where he joined Poale Zion Left. He was amongst the founders of the Marxist Studies Group and the Socialist League, and was an activist for the Hashomer Hatzair Workers Party and later Mapam.

In 1942 he became a member of Tel Aviv Workers Council. In 1949 he joined the Histadrut's executive committee, and became a member of its organising committee in 1955. In 1966 he was appointed chairman of the union's Department for Industrial Democracy, and was also a lecturer at the School for Histadrut Activists.

In 1973 he was elected to the Knesset on the Alignment list, an alliance of Mapam and the Labor Party. On 10 April 1977 Mapam broke away from the Alignment, but rejoined two days later. Dranitzki lost his seat in the 1977 elections.

He died in 2002 at the age of 92.

References

External links
 

1910 births
2002 deaths
Odesa Jews
Soviet emigrants to Mandatory Palestine
Israeli trade unionists
Jewish socialists
Alignment (Israel) politicians
Mapam politicians
Members of the 8th Knesset (1974–1977)
Burials at Kiryat Shaul Cemetery